Andrea Bruce (born 10 July 1955) is a Jamaican athlete. She competed in the women's high jump at the 1972 Summer Olympics, making it to the final round and placing ninth.

Athletics
Bruce attended Prairie View A&M University, where she competed on the track and field team. She was the US national champion in the 400-meter hurdles in 1974.

She placed second in the high jump in the 1975 US indoor nationals.

References

1955 births
Living people
Athletes (track and field) at the 1972 Summer Olympics
Athletes (track and field) at the 1976 Summer Olympics
Jamaican female high jumpers
Jamaican pentathletes
Olympic athletes of Jamaica
Athletes (track and field) at the 1970 British Commonwealth Games
Athletes (track and field) at the 1971 Pan American Games
Athletes (track and field) at the 1975 Pan American Games
Pan American Games bronze medalists for Jamaica
Pan American Games medalists in athletics (track and field)
Place of birth missing (living people)
Medalists at the 1971 Pan American Games
Medalists at the 1975 Pan American Games
Commonwealth Games competitors for Jamaica
20th-century Jamaican women
21st-century Jamaican women